The Kubicek M-2 Scout is a Czech ultralight and light-sport aircraft, designed and produced by Kubicek Aircraft. It was first flown in May 2009. The aircraft is supplied as a complete ready-to-fly-aircraft.

In Czech the manufacturer refers to itself as Kubíček Aircraft but in English they call themselves Kubicek Aircraft.

Design and development
The aircraft was intended as an update to the 1948 Mráz M-2 Skaut design. The original M-2 was made from wood and so the two aircraft resemble each other only superficially. The new M-2 was designed to comply with the Fédération Aéronautique Internationale microlight rules and US light-sport aircraft rules. It features a cantilever low-wing, a two-seats-in-side-by-side configuration enclosed cockpit under a bubble canopy, fixed tricycle landing gear and a single engine in tractor configuration.

The aircraft is made from riveted and bonded aluminum sheet and is completely corrosion-treated after assembly. The standard engine available is the  Rotax 912ULS four-stroke powerplant.

Variants
M-2 Scout LSA
Model for the US light-sport category with a gross weight of 
M-2 Scout UL
Model for the European ultralight category with a gross weight of

Specifications (M-2 Scout LSA)

References

External links
Official website

2000s Czech ultralight aircraft
Homebuilt aircraft
Light-sport aircraft
Single-engined tractor aircraft